Colin Roberts  (born 31 July 1959) is a British diplomat and the former Governor of the Falkland Islands and former Commissioner of the South Georgia and the South Sandwich Islands.

He was educated at Winchester College, The Courtauld Institute of Art and King's College, Cambridge.

He previously served as British Ambassador to Lithuania, from 2004 to 2008, Commissioner of the British Indian Ocean Territory and the British Antarctic Territory from 2008 to 2012 and Director of the FCO Eastern Europe and Central Asia Directorate from 2012 to 2014. Roberts also held diplomatic service posts in Japan and France.

In April 2010, Roberts, acting on the instructions of David Miliband—established a marine nature reserve around the Chagos Islands known as the Chagos Marine Protected Area. The designation proved controversial as the decision was announced during a period when the UK Parliament was in recess.

On 1 December 2010 a leaked US Embassy London diplomatic cable dating back to 2009 exposed British and US calculations in creating the marine nature reserve. The cable relays exchanges between US Political Counselor Richard Mills and British Director of the Foreign and Commonwealth Office Colin Roberts, in which Roberts "asserted that establishing a marine park would, in effect, put paid to resettlement claims of the archipelago's former residents." Richard Mills concludes:

In 2013 it was announced that Roberts had been appointed Governor of the Falkland Islands and Commissioner for South Georgia and the South Sandwich Islands, to take up office in April 2014. Alicia Castro, Argentina's ambassador to the United Kingdom, criticised Roberts's appointment as a "provocation" and said he was "not the person to encourage dialogue between nations".

In June 2017 the Foreign and Commonwealth Office announced that Roberts would be leaving the Falklands, to be replaced as Governor and Commissioner by Nigel Phillips in September 2017.

References

1959 births
Living people
People educated at Winchester College
Alumni of King's College, Cambridge
Ambassadors of the United Kingdom to Lithuania
Commanders of the Royal Victorian Order
Commissioners for South Georgia and the South Sandwich Islands
Commissioners of the British Antarctic Territory
Commissioners of the British Indian Ocean Territory
Governors of the Falkland Islands